Songs for the Jet Set is the third studio album by the band Drugstore. It was recorded at Battery Studios in London in under two weeks, and the track "Baby Don't Hurt Yourself" features Paul Niehauss, from Lambchop, on pedal steel.

Track listing

Personnel
Isabel Monteiro - bass, vocals, piano, acoustic guitar, artwork, lyrics
Daron Robinson - electric guitar, acoustic guitar, vocals
Mike Chylinski - drums, percussion, backing vocals
Ian Burdge - cello, piano, keyboards, backing vocals

References

2001 albums
Drugstore (band) albums